Khym Lam (born 1963 or '64) is a Singaporean-born Australian actress.

Biography
Lam was born in Singapore to a Malayan father and a Eurasian mother—her grandparents were Charles Davis, a Welsh engineer who married May Lawrence, a part-Chinese woman, before World War II. Lam and her family moved to Australia when she was aged seven. She studied film-making in Melbourne, while waitressing and taking acting roles to support her studies.

Lam's breakthrough role came in 1988 when she was cast as the female lead role of Julie Soong in the Network Ten mini-series Tanamera – Lion of Singapore. She also had a lead role as Yoshie in the 1987 horror film Zombie Brigade.

In 1991, Lam played the Shitsu Tonka Newsreader in the ABC TV comedy series DAAS Kapital. It was on the series that she met Doug Anthony All Stars member Richard Fidler who she would go on to marry in 1993 and have one son and one daughter with him.

In 1994 and 1995, Lam appeared in several episodes of Neighbours as Ling Mai Chan, the daughter of Lou Carpenter.

Publications
In 1998, Lam wrote a recipe book, Eating In: a Post Modern Posthaste Experience, which was published by Hodder Headline.

References

External links

1960s births
Living people
Australian television actresses
Australian film actresses
Australian people of Malaysian descent
Australian people of Chinese descent
Australian people of Welsh descent
People from Singapore
Singaporean actresses
Singaporean emigrants to Australia
Singaporean people of Chinese descent
Singaporean people of Malaysian descent
Singaporean people of Welsh descent
Australian actresses of Asian descent